Saint Felicianus may refer to:

See Primus and Felician, for the martyrs Felicianus and Primus
Felician of Foligno (ca. AD 160–ca. AD 250), patron saint of Foligno